Joan Payzant was a Canadian author most known for her historical fiction. She wrote about the history of Dartmouth and Halifax, Nova Scotia, Canada.

Life
Payzant was born in Dartmouth, Nova Scotia, Canada on 4 February 1925. She graduated from Dalhousie University. She died in Halifax, Nova Scotia on 14 August 2013.

Author
Her first major book was about the ferry that connects Halifax and Dartmouth. She also wrote children's books including Who's a Scaredy-Cat! - A Story of the Halifax Explosion, which is a story surrounding two families in Dartmouth at the time of the Halifax explosion. After her idea for Scaredy-cat was rejected, Payzant stated that "I knew from having been a school librarian that it would be popular at the annual anniversary of the terrible Halifax disaster of 1917." As a result, she published this book herself to coincide with the 75th anniversary of the explosion in 1992. She hired an illustrator and printed 1500 copies of the book, which sold out in five months. By 1997 it was in its fourth printing and was added to the Nova Scotia Department of Education School Book Bureau list.

Payzant wrote biographies of her parents (Rob and Francie) and her husband (Pete). Both were privately printed.

Columnist
Payzant was a columnist for the Dartmouth Free Press from 1979 to 1983. Over this period she wrote more than 200 articles on topics as diverse as travel, gardening, and Dartmouth history.

Awards
 Fellow of the Royal Nova Scotia Historical Society.
 Marianna Dempster Memorial Award (1993)
 Evelyn Richardson Memorial Literary Trust Award (1980)

Selected works

 Crumbs (1976)
 Like a Weaver's Shuttle: A History of the Halifax-Dartmouth Ferries (1979). Co-authored with Lewis J. Payzant.
 Halifax: Cornerstone of Canada (1985)
 Atlantic Canada: At the Dawn of a New Nation. Co-authored with Shannon Ryan, Greg Marquis, and E. Boyd Beck.
 Who's a Scaredy-Cat!: A Story of the Halifax Explosion (1992)
 We Love to Ride the Ferry: 250 Years of Halifax-Dartmouth Ferry Crossings (2002)
 December 1917: Re-visiting the Halifax Explosion (2006). Co-authored with Janet Kitz.

References

1925 births
2013 deaths
Canadian women novelists
Canadian children's writers
People from Dartmouth, Nova Scotia
Writers from Halifax, Nova Scotia
20th-century Canadian novelists
21st-century Canadian novelists
20th-century Canadian women writers
21st-century Canadian women writers